{{DISPLAYTITLE:C8H14}}
The molecular formula C8H14 (molar mass: 110.20 g/mol) may refer to:

 Allylcyclopentane
 Biisobutenyl
 Bimethallyl
 Cyclooctenes
 cis-Cyclooctene
 trans-Cyclooctene
 Methylcycloheptene
 Methylenecycloheptane
 1,7-Octadiene
 Octynes
 1-Octyne
 2-Octyne
 3-Octyne
 4-Octyne
 Bicyclooctane
 Bicyclo[2.2.2]octane
 Bicyclo[3.3.0]octane (polyquinane)
 Bicyclo[3.2.1]octane

References